Las Piedras Airport  is an airport serving the agricultural region southwest of Cañas in Guanacaste Province, Costa Rica.

See also

 Transport in Costa Rica
 List of airports in Costa Rica

References

External links
 OurAirports - Las Piedras
 OpenStreetMap - Las Piedras
 HERE/Nokia - Las Piedras
 FallingRain - Las Piedras
 

Airports in Costa Rica
Guanacaste Province